Major-General Gerald James Cuthbert  (12 September 1861 – 1 February 1931) was a British Army officer who commanded a battalion in the Boer War and a division in the First World War. Cuthbert joined the Scots Guards in 1882 and served in Egypt and the Sudan during the late 19th century. During the Boer War he served with his regiment, rising to command a battalion and after the war he was given command of a brigade in the Territorial Force and then in the British Expeditionary Force of 1914. He served on the Western Front from 1914 to 1917, rising to command 39th Division, then returned to home service before retiring in 1919.

Early career
The fifth son of William Cuthbert of Beaufront Castle in Northumberland, Gerald was privately educated, and attended the Royal Military College, Sandhurst. He was commissioned in the Oxfordshire Light Infantry in May 1882, transferring to the Scots Guards two months later. He served with the 2nd Battalion during the Sudan Expedition of 1885, where he saw service at the Battle of Suakin, and in 1889–90 was the aide-de-camp to Major-General Frederick Forestier-Walker at Aldershot. Returning to his regiment, he was promoted to Captain in 1893, and appointed adjutant of the 2nd Battalion from February 1895 to February 1899. Shortly after his period as adjutant was finished, in May, he was promoted to Major.

He served extensively during the Second Boer War, seeing action at Belmont, Enslin, Modder River, Magersfontein, Poplar Grove, Dreifontein, Vet River, Zand River, Johannesburg, Pretoria, Diamond Hill, Riet Vlei, and Belfast. Between January and July 1901, he commanded the 1st Battalion Scots Guards. He was mentioned in despatches during the war, and given a brevet promotion to lieutenant-colonel (dated 29 November 1900) in the South Africa Honours list 1901. Back with the 2nd battalion on the conclusion of hostilities in June 1902, he left Port Natal with men of this battalion on the SS Michigan in late September 1902, arriving at Southampton in late October, when the battalion was posted to Aldershot.

Following the Boer War, he again commanded the 1st Battalion from 1904 until 1906, when he was relieved of his command and placed on half-pay after an inquiry into ragging in the battalion. Later that year, he was posted to Egypt as a temporary assistant adjutant-general; this was made permanent in December.  He remained on the staff in Egypt until October 1909. He then returned home to command the 4th London Brigade in 2nd London Division, a Territorial Force unit, as well as the regimental district of the Scots Guards. In February 1914 he was appointed to command 13th Infantry Brigade, a regular brigade in 5th Division, stationed in Ireland.

First World War
Cuthbert remained in command of 13th Brigade when it was mobilised for service in the British Expeditionary Force after the First World War began in August 1914. He took the brigade to France and commanded it through the Retreat from Mons, the First Battle of the Marne and the First Battle of the Aisne.  He was sent back to England at the end of September and placed on "invalid" status.  He was succeeded by William Hickie. On 26 November, Cuthbert was appointed to take command of a Territorial unit; this was the 140th Infantry Brigade, which he had commanded in its peacetime incarnation as the 4th London Brigade, of the 47th (2nd London) Division. He remained with them through 1915 and 1916, culminating in the German attack on Vimy Ridge in May 1916, where Cuthbert led the division in lieu of the divisional commander, who was on leave. He was not a popular brigadier; the London volunteers particularly objected to his strict views on cleanliness, a story circulated that he had ordered front-line trenches to be swept out with brooms. He was nicknamed "Spit and Polish" by the infantry as a result of his obsession with appearances, alongside his earlier nickname of "Bluebell", which may have been a reference to a brand of polish.

He left the 140th Brigade in early July 1916, promoted to command 39th Division. He commanded it during the later phases of the Battle of the Somme and the Battle of Pilckem. His record with the division was not well received by his superiors; Claud Jacob of II Corps described him as "obstinate and mulish" during the Battle of the Somme, whilst Ivor Maxse of XVIII Corps noted he had "little or no conception of training methods", and "few ideas" regarding tactical operations; his only merit was perceived to be his rigorous approach to discipline. He was removed from command in August 1917, and transferred to command the 72nd Division on home service. He later commanded Shorncliffe Army Camp, before retiring from the Army in 1919.

Retirement
Cuthbert never married.  After he retired from the service, he lived in Sandhoe Garden Cottage on the family estate at Beaufront Castle. He died in February 1931, aged 69.

Notes

References

"CUTHBERT, Maj.-Gen. Gerald James". (2007). In Who Was Who. Online edition
Obituary in the Times, 2 February 1931, p. 14
 
 
 
 

|-

|-

|-

1861 births
1931 deaths
British Army personnel of the Mahdist War
British Army personnel of the Second Boer War
British Army generals of World War I
Companions of the Order of St Michael and St George
Companions of the Order of the Bath
Graduates of the Royal Military College, Sandhurst
Scots Guards officers
British Army major generals
Oxfordshire and Buckinghamshire Light Infantry officers
Territorial Force officers